Döttingen may refer to the following places:

In Germany
Döttingen, a subdivision of Braunsbach, Baden-Württemberg 
Döttingen, a subdivision of Herresbach, Rhineland-Palatinate

In Switzerland
Döttingen, Aargau, in the Canton of Aargau